Lucien Félix Henry born in Sisteron (Alpes-de-Haute-Provence) on May 22, 1850 and died in Saint-Léonard-de-Noblat (Haute-Vienne) on March 10, 1896, was a French painter, who was active in Sydney.

A socialist, he was part of the Paris Commune. He is often confused with Fortuné Henry, another Communard, in many historical works on the Commune.

Life 
Lucien Henry arrived in Paris in 1867 to take courses in Fine Arts and studied under Viollet-le-Duc before studying with Jean-Léon Gérôme.  A militant socialist and a member of the First International, he contributed to the newspaper La Resistance. During the Franco-Prussian war and the siege of Paris (1870-1871) he was a member of the National Guard. On March 11, 1871, he was elected leader of the legion of the 14th arrondissement and became “Colonel Henry”. On April 3, he took part in the exit from Châtillon (Battle of Meudon),where the communards were defeated by the forces of the Third Republic. During this unfortunate offensive he was arrested, and sentenced to death in 1872, but the sentence was commuted to deportation to New Caledonia.

Granted amnesty in 1878, he moved to Australia in June 1879, the year of Sydney World's Fair. In 1880 he married another exile, Juliette Rastoul née Lopez. In Sydney Henry became known as a painter and teacher. The stained glass windows in Sydney Town Hall were an important work. He became a teacher of art at the Sydney Technical College, and took a uniquely Australian approach to the decorative arts, with the use of motifs inspired by local flora and fauna such as Telopea (waratah). Returning to France in 1891 in search of a publisher for a collection of his Australian watercolors, he died in 1896 in the hamlet of Le Pavé in Saint-Léonard-de-Noblat where he was buried.

Work 
Some of his work is held in the Art Gallery of New South Wales, and some 204 works are held at the Powerhouse Museum, including works with native flora motifs.

Further reading 

 Pierre-Henri Zaidman, Lucien-Félix Henry, colonel de la Commune, condamné à mort et artiste australien, éditions du Baboune, 86 p..

References

Communards
19th-century French painters
19th-century Australian painters
1850 births
1896 deaths
Fellows of the American Physical Society